Paperplay is a British children's television programme, produced by Thames Television for the ITV network between 1974 and 1981. The show was devised and presented by Susan Stranks, a former Magpie presenter.

In each show, Stranks would make simple creations from paper and other household waste. Assisting her would be two mischievous hand puppet spiders named Itsy and Bitsy. Itsy was the red male, growling spider and Bitsy the yellow female, squeaking spider. Occasionally they were joined by other puppets, such as Boris the ladybird, Cardew the caterpillar and Katie the bird. The puppets were operated by Norman Beardsley, who was hidden by a black backdrop.

References

External links
Itsy and Bitsy at Toonhound
Paperplay at sausageNet

British television shows featuring puppetry
ITV children's television shows
1974 British television series debuts
1981 British television series endings
Arts and crafts television series